The  2013 Honda Indy Toronto was a Canadian open wheel motor race held as the twelfth and thirteenth rounds of the 2013 IndyCar Series season. It was the 27th Indy Toronto For the first time in its 28-year history it was held over two races instead of one. The races were contested over 85 laps each at the  street course at Exhibition Place in Toronto, Ontario, Canada.

Both races were won by New Zealander Scott Dixon driving for the Chip Ganassi Racing team. By the end of the weekend Dixon had won three races consecutively, adding to his victory in the previous race, the Pocono IndyCar 400. Dixon had risen from fourth in the points to second, just 29 points behind Hélio Castroneves putting his charge towards his third Indycar championship back on track. Dragon Racing's Sébastien Bourdais had his best weekend of the season, finishing second on Saturday and third on Sunday behind Castroneves. Dixon's teammate Dario Franchitti followed immediate behind Bourdais in both races for a third and a fourth, scoring more points than Castroneves for the weekend.

The first race saw Dixon overhaul Bourdais late in the race to take the victory. The much hyped standing start was shifted from Race 1 to Race 2 after Josef Newgarden stalled on the grid for the Saturday race. Franchitti's third place was originally taken away when he was assigned a 25-second penalty for blocking Will Power's attempted overtake for third place on the final lap. Power hit the barriers and would be classified in 15th. The penalty was later rescinded. Early in the race Ryan Briscoe broke his wrist in an accident. Indly Lights driver Carlos Muñoz was drafted in to replace him on Sunday.

Dixon dominated the Sunday race, leading home Castroneves ahead of a battle between Bourdais, Franchitti, Power and Ryan Hunter-Reay that ended with a collision that eliminated Power, Hunter-Reay and Takuma Sato.

They were Dixon's first wins in Toronto and the fifth and sixth IndyCar victories in Toronto for Chip Ganassi Racing.

Classification

Round 12

Round 13

Notes
 Points include 1 point for pole position and 2 points for most laps led.

Standings after the race

Drivers' Championship

Note: Only the top five positions are included for the driver standings.

References

External links

Indy Toronto
Honda Indy Toronto
Honda Indy Toronto
Honda Indy Toronto
Honda Indy Toronto